MiniDiscs [Hacked] is a compilation of recordings by the English alternative rock band Radiohead, made while they were working on their 1997 album OK Computer. It comprises more than 16 hours of demos, rehearsals, live performances and other material. 

The recordings are taken from MiniDiscs belonging to the singer, Thom Yorke, and were not intended for release. After they were leaked online in June 2019, Radiohead released them through the music sharing site Bandcamp for 18 days, with all proceeds going to the environmentalist group Extinction Rebellion.  

The compilation received positive reviews. Though critics said that its size made it daunting for some listeners, they praised the insight into the making of OK Computer.

Content 
MiniDiscs [Hacked] contains more than 16 hours of demos, rehearsals, outtakes, and live performances recorded while Radiohead were working on their third album, OK Computer (1997). It includes unreleased songs, alternative mixes, early versions of OK Computer songs (such as an extended version of "Paranoid Android"), and versions of the later songs "Lift", "True Love Waits", "Nude", "Last Flowers", "Motion Picture Soundtrack" and "Life in a Glasshouse".

The recordings are taken from MiniDiscs belonging to the Radiohead singer, Thom Yorke. Though some had been released on the 2017 OK Computer reissue OKNOTOK 1997 2017, most were not intended for release.

Release 

On 5 June 2019, the recordings were leaked online by a collector using the name Zimbra, who said he had traded them for unreleased Beatles recordings. They may have been stolen while archived material was being prepared for the OK Computer reissue. The guitarist Ed O'Brien said they had been hacked from Radiohead's cloud archive.

According to conflicting reports, Zimbra initially demanded a $150,000 ransom from Radiohead not to release the recordings. However, according to an investigation by Pitchfork, Zimbra had instead hoped to sell them to fans. Zimbra told Pitchfork that "the whole $150k thing and 'ransom' was taken way out of context". A fan who negotiated with Zimbra said he did not believe extortion was his intent: "He never told us anything to suggest he was trying to get money from the band, only from fans." Zimbra released the recordings free after news broke on the discussion platform Reddit.

On 11 June, Radiohead made the recordings available to stream or purchase from the music distribution site Bandcamp for 18 days. All proceeds went to the environmentalist group Extinction Rebellion, raising approximately £500,000. The official release removed a 12-minute field recording and non-Radiohead material, such as several minutes of a James Bond score. The guitarist Jonny Greenwood wrote on Twitter that the collection was "only tangentially interesting", while Yorke wrote on the Bandcamp page: "As it's out there it may as well be out there until we all get bored and move on."

Reception

Pitchfork wrote that MiniDiscs [Hacked] did not "make for an ideal listening experience" and would be of interest "only to the most diehard Radiohead fans". They observed a "few moments of brilliance (and strangeness)", including Yorke's acoustic songs, the extended "Paranoid Android", and an alternative version of "Lift" that "could have topped the charts".

However, The Guardian felt MiniDiscs [Hacked] had merit "even for less nerdish fans", and wrote that was "an endlessly interesting chronicle of a band reinventing the mainstream by rejecting it ... [It shows] the inner workings of what is regarded by many as the greatest album of the 1990s, showing how they walked alongside and then turned away from the brash Britpop that surrounded them."

The New Statesman wrote that "starting, skipping and scrolling" through the lengthy tracks "makes for a surprisingly liberating experience, akin to wandering Radiohead’s subconscious memory palace and occasionally encountering the familiar in a different form". The Quietus praised the "stunning" live performances and particularly Yorke's demos, and wrote of the "unromantic revealing" of the process of creating music.

Track listing

Each MiniDisc is included as a single track lasting approximately an hour; the contents are not broken into individual tracks. Fans assembled a Google document to identify songs and timestamps.

References

External links 
 (archive link as of 12 June 2019)

Fan-made document cataloguing the compilation contents – via Google Docs

2019 compilation albums
Hacking in the 2010s
Radiohead compilation albums
Self-released albums